Filippo Scaglia (born 31 January 1992) is an Italian professional footballer who plays as a centre-back for Italian club Como.

Club career

Early career
Born in Turin, Scaglia is a product of the Torino youth system. In the summer of 2011, he moved on loan to Bassano, a team of Lega Pro Prima Divisione; he closed his first season among the professionals with 22 league appearances with the Venetian team, and was subsequently transferred (also on loan) to Cuneo on 19 July 2012. With the Piedmont team he disputed another 22 games of the Lega Pro Prima Divisione (plus one in Coppa Italia and one in the Coppa Italia Lega Pro, a competition in which on 4 October 2012 he scored his first goal, in the game lost 3–2 to Tritium Calcio 1908). He also scored his first goal in the professional leagues on November 4, 2012, in the match won 2–0 against Pavia. In the first part of the 2013–14 season he remained with Torino in Serie A; however, he never made his debut in official matches from the Granata, who on 28 January 2014 loaned him to Cittadella in Serie B with the option to redeem 50% of his contract in co-ownership.

Cittadella 
After playing 18 games (during which he also scored his first goal in Serie B), the Venetians redeemed half 50% of his contract and reconfirmed him for the 2014–15 season,
 played again in Serie B, but did not manage to avoid relegation of the club finished in last place. He was in the Top 15 of defenders of Serie B according to a list compiled by the Lega Serie B.

Monza
On 7 January 2019, he signed a 2.5-year contract with Monza.

Como
On 13 July 2021, Scaglia moved to Como on a two-year contract.

Honours
Cittadella
 Lega Pro: 2015–16

Monza
 Serie C Group A: 2019–20

References

External links

1993 births
Living people
Footballers from Turin
Italian footballers
Association football defenders
Torino F.C. players
Bassano Virtus 55 S.T. players
A.C. Cuneo 1905 players
A.S. Cittadella players
A.C. Monza players
Como 1907 players
Serie B players
Serie C players
Italy youth international footballers